The Iberá Wetlands (from Guaraní ý berá: "bright water") are a mix of swamps, bogs, stagnant lakes, lagoons, natural slough, and courses of water in the center and center-north of the .

Iberá is one of the most important freshwater reservoirs in South America and the second-largest wetland in the world after Pantanal in Brazil.

There are ongoing plans to further up its protection status to national park.

See also
 Iberá Provincial Reserve

References

External links
Rewilding Ibera: Efforts made to save Argentina’s wetlands. Al Jazeera Englisch, January 2021 (video, 4:25 mins)

Wetlands of Argentina
Ramsar sites in Argentina
Geography of Corrientes Province
Guaraní words and phrases
La Plata basin